The Russo-Georgian War had a huge humanitarian impact on the lives of civilians. In the aftermath of the war, ethnic Georgians were expelled from South Ossetia and most of the Georgian villages were razed.

South Ossetians

Tskhinvali
Russian media reported on 9 August that several journalists had gone into hiding as they appealed to the international community for right of passage. 

According to later Russian statements, about 20 percent of Tskhinvali's some 7,000 buildings had been damaged and 10 percent were "beyond repair".

HRW entered the mostly deserted Tskhinvali on 13 August 2008 and reported that apartment buildings and houses had damaged by shelling. They also reported that buildings had been damaged by "inherently indiscriminate" artillery which should not be used on populated areas. For example, rockets most likely fired from BM-21 Grad multiple rocket launchers.

Refugees

On 10 August 2008, HRW got numbers of displaced people counted by the Russian government agency in Vladikavkaz, according to which, the Federal Migration Service counted 24,032 persons who fled South Ossetia to Russia. On 16 August 2008, ITAR-TASS put the number of refugees at over 10,000 refugees.

Casualties

On 8 August 2008, the International Committee of the Red Cross (ICRC) urged the combatants to form a humanitarian corridor in South Ossetia to evacuate the wounded civilians.

On 13 August Human Rights Watch said that deliberate attempts by the Russian government to exaggerate the number of casualties in the conflict provoked revenge attacks on Georgian villagers in South Ossetia.

According to a doctor at Tskhinvali hospital, the hospital treated 273 military and civilian wounded from 6 to 12 August. According to a later report by the Russian blogger, he asked the same doctor: "Could there possibly be 2,000 dead?" The doctor answered him: "If you’re counting the entire district, then yes." 

On 20 August, following an investigation in South Ossetia and amongst refugees, the number of dead civilians identified was put by Russia at 133; nevertheless, South Ossetian officials said 1,492 people died.

On 21 August 2008, Russia scaled down its estimate of the number of killed South Ossetian civilians, admitting that the toll could be about a tenth of its first claims.

Hostages
By 20 August the South Ossetian estimate was scaled down to some 170 "peaceful citizens" allegedly held by Georgia.

Georgians

Bombings
On 9 August 2008, Russian jets bombed Gori. The bombs hit residential buildings. Russian Foreign Minister Sergey Lavrov said Georgia brought the airstrikes upon itself by bombing civilians and Russian peacekeepers. On 12 August 2008, an attack on the main square in Gori killed dozens of civilians, including a Dutch journalist.

On 16 August 2008, Human Rights Watch said it had collected evidence of Russian warplanes using RBK-250 cluster bombs, each containing 30 PTAB 2.5M submunitions; rights group urged Russia to stop using the weapons, which more than 100 nations have agreed to outlaw. When asked about the report, Russian General Anatoly Nogovitsyn claimed: "We never use cluster bombs. There is no need to do so." On 22 August 2008, HRW reported that unexploded cluster munitions were left in Gori and at other locations.

Displacement of civilians

Before the war started, one estimate of the population of ethnic Georgians living in South Ossetia was 18,000 people, up to one quarter of the population. On 10 August 2008, Georgia charged that ethnic cleansing of Georgians was occurring behind Russian lines. On 15 August, UNHCR said that according to Georgian officials, up to 15,000 ethnic Georgians had fled into the other parts of Georgia from South Ossetia. As of 15 August 2008, some 73,000 people were displaced in Georgia proper. On 17 August 2008, The Independent reported that many refugees from South Ossetia in Tbilisi were crammed into makeshift centres without basic amenities and had no possessions with them, except the clothes they were wearing when they fled. By 19 August, the UNHCR figure of the displaced persons rose to 158,600. On 20 August, The Guardian reported that "The scale of ethnic cleansing in the district nine miles north of Gori was strikingly apparent". Kokoity said most of the Georgian villages "had been virtually flattened."

Russian soldiers allegedly told the Georgians in Gori: "Putin has given us an order that everyone must be either shot or forced to leave". HRW documented several cases in which Russian occupying forces opened fire on civilian vehicles in Gori district, killing or wounding civilians.

The Finnish Minister for Foreign Affairs and the OSCE chairman Alexander Stubb visited the war-affected area in Georgia and accused the Russian troops of "clearly trying to empty southern Ossetia of Georgians." On 27 August, the French foreign minister Bernard Kouchner accused the Russian troops of "ethnic cleansing, creating a homogeneous South Ossetia."

On 28 August 2008, some 2,300 people from the villages north of Gori which were still under the Russian military control, had to register as internally displaced people in Gori. Civilians willing to live in South Ossetia were forced to accept a Russian passport.

The war displaced 192,000 people, and while many were able to return to their homes after the war, a year later around 30,000 ethnic Georgians remained displaced. As of May 2014, 20,272 persons remain displaced whose return is denied by the separatist authorities.

Looting
On 12 August, HRW researchers in South Ossetia witnessed at least four ethnic Georgian villages being destroyed. On 13 August an interviewed South Ossetian officer acknowledged that the South Ossetian forces burned these houses "to make sure that they [the Georgians] can’t come back." HRW also learned from an Ossetian officer about the summary execution of a Georgian combatant, and that the looters, who were "everywhere" in the Georgian villages in South Ossetia, were "now moving to Gori". By 14 August, already after the official ceasefire, many international media outlets reported Georgian government and refugee stories that Ossetian and often also other pro-Russian irregulars (including reports of Cossack and Chechen paramilitaries) were looting and burning Georgian villages in South Ossetia and near Gori.

According to Russia's Interfax, two looters were executed by firing squad in South Ossetia. Nevertheless, on 14 August, The Daily Telegraph reporter witnessed South Ossetian irregulars continuing to loot and pillage around Gori, often with the encouragement of Russian troops, including a Russian officer shouting to "take whatever you want". Vehicles were even carjacked from the international officials by paramilitaries while Russian soldiers watched.

The looting and burning of Georgian villages in South Ossetia continued in late August. An AP reporter saw burning and looting of Georgian homes in at least six separate areas from 22 August through 28 August. It was also reported that according to South Ossetian officials ethnic Georgian civilians in South Ossetia were "detained for their own protection" and were expelled to the Georgian side. Russian tour guide told a group of foreign journalists that "Georgian special commandos burned the houses."

On 28 August, United Nations Institute for Training and Research (UNITAR) Operational Satellite Applications Programme UNOSAT published report on an initial damage assessment on 19 August, based on satellite images of Gori. Total number of buildings that were classified as affected by Russian air raid, was 33, of which 18 were destroyed, and 15 were severely damaged. The UNOSAT report does not specify whether the damage was inflicted to military or civilian buildings. Human Rights Watch used the satellite images to confirm the widespread burning of ethnic-Georgian villages by Ossetian militia in South Ossetia.

Abuse of civilians

The new waves of Georgian refugees bringing reports of the widespread pillage and "revenge" killings in the territories occupied by the Russian forces kept coming over the next days.

On 16 August, an Associated Press reporter witnessed groups of Georgian forced laborers in Tskhinvali under armed guard of Ossetians and Russians; South Ossetia's interior minister Mikhail Mindzayev acknowledged this, saying that the Georgians "are cleaning up after themselves". The Independent reported that around 40 Georgian civilian captives, mostly elderly men, were "paraded" through the city and abused by South Ossetians. On 18 August, South Ossetian leaders put the number of the hostages at more than 130, roughly half of them women and mostly former Georgian guest workers. The kidnapping of civilians by warring parties is a war crime according to the Article 3 of the Fourth Geneva Convention.

Russian (Novaya Gazeta) and British (The Sunday Times) journalists embedded with the Russian and Ossetian forces reported that irregulars were abusing and executing captured Georgian soldiers and suspected combatants captured during the "mopping-up operation" in South Ossetia and beyond.

In 2009, Human Rights Watch reported that armed gangs and Ossetian militia engaged in looting, arson attacks, rape and abductions in Georgian areas under Russian control, forcing the civilian population to flee.

Reactions and assessments
According to an 18 August report by Human Rights Watch (HRW), when the military conflict began on 7 August 2008, Georgian military used indiscriminate and disproportionate force resulting in civilian deaths in South Ossetia. The Russian military used indiscriminate force in South Ossetia and in the Gori district, and apparently targeted convoys of civilians attempting to flee the conflict zones. Russian warplanes bombed civilian population centres in Georgia and Georgian villages in South Ossetia. HRW said that ongoing looting, arson attacks, and abductions by South Ossetian militia was terrorizing the Georgian civilian population, forcing them to flee and preventing displaced people from returning. The organisation called the conflict "a disaster for civilians", and said an international security mission should be deployed. HRW also called for international organisations to send fact-finding missions to establish the facts, report on human rights and urge the authorities to account for crimes committed.

On 5 September 2008, the first international delegation consisting of Members of Parliament visited Tskhinvali on a journey organised by the Russian Duma. The Latvian Nikolay Kabanov said he found the destruction greater than he anticipated. Lubomír Zaorálek, Deputy Chairman of the Chamber of Deputies of the Czech Republic stated that he "did not understand the military purpose of the action." The Bulgarian MP Petar Kanev, chairman of the group for Bulgarian-Russian Friendship in the National Assembly, said that he did not see any military object hit by the Georgian army.

On 5 September 2008, the ambassadors of Sweden, Latvia and Estonia were barred from visiting Georgian villages beyond Russian checkpoints on September 5. The purpose of their visit had been to deliver aid, assess the situation and verify allegations of ethnic cleansing in the area. In a statement they said the restrictions violated the Vienna Convention on diplomatic relations and the cease-fire deal. On 8 September, Russian soldiers prevented international aid convoys from visiting Georgian villages in South Ossetia.

On 8 September Council of Europe Commissioner for Human Rights Thomas Hammarberg issued a report, "Human Rights in Areas Affected by the South Ossetia Conflict", stating that during the conflict "a very large number of people had been victimised. More than half of the population in South Ossetia fled, the overwhelming majority of them after the Georgian artillery and tank attack on Tskhinvali and the assaults on Georgian villages by South Ossetian militia and criminal gangs." The report said that the main Tskhinvali hospital had been hit by rockets, some residential areas in Tskhinvali were "completely destroyed" and "the main building of the Russian peace keeping force as well as the base's medical dispensary had been hit by heavy artillery." Villages with ethnic-Georgian majorities between Tskhinvali and Java had been destroyed by South Ossetian militia and criminal gangs. It was also reported that Georgians and Russians used M85S and RBK 250 cluster bombs, causing civilian casualties. Georgia was also reported to have used cluster munitions twice to hit civilians fleeing through the main escape route, and admitted using cluster bombs against Russian troops and the Roki Tunnel. Although Russia was accused of using cluster bombs, it denied the allegations.

On 11 September 2008, Memorial reported that the villages of Kekhvi, Kurta, Achabeti, Tamarasheni, Eredvi, Vanati and Avnevi were "virtually fully burnt down".

On 2 October 2008, Resolution 1633 of the Parliamentary Assembly of the Council of Europe (PACE) confirmed that Georgian army used cluster munitions saying "[t]he use of heavy weapons and cluster munitions, creating grave risks for civilians, constituted a disproportionate use of armed force by Georgia, albeit within its own territory, and as such a violation of international humanitarian law".

Amnesty International noted that the most of the damage in Tskhinvali was sustained on or before 10 August and was likely caused by the intense fighting between the Georgian and Russian militaries around 8 August. However, a number of Georgian villages near Tskhinvali were damaged after the major hostilities ended.

BBC interviewed one of the South Ossetian combatants who claimed he was also responsible for burning the Georgian houses.

In November 2008, Human Rights Watch reported that during the war, South Ossetians burned and looted most ethnic-Georgian villages in South Ossetia, effectively preventing 20,000 residents displaced by the conflict from returning.

In November 2008, Amnesty International released a 69-page report detailing serious international-law violations by Georgia and Russia.

Georgia and South Ossetia have filed complaints with international courts, including the International Criminal Court (ICC), the International Court of Justice and the European Court of Human Rights.

In January 2009, Human Rights Watch concluded that all parties seriously violated the law of war, resulting in many civilian casualties. Georgian forces attacked South Ossetia "with blatant disregard for the safety of civilians". Georgian forces used Grad multiple rocket launchers, self-propelled artillery, mortars and howitzers during the attack. The South Ossetian parliament building and several schools and nurseries were used as defence positions or operational posts by South Ossetian forces and volunteer militias, and targeted by Georgian artillery fire. In many of the shelled villages, Ossetian militia positions were near civilian housing. Georgia stated that the attacks only intended to "neutralize firing positions from where Georgian positions were being targeted." HRW documented witness accounts that civilian objects were used by South Ossetian forces (making them legitimate military targets), concluding that South Ossetian forces were responsible for endangering civilians by setting up defensive positions in near (or in) civilian structures. Georgia was responsible for indiscriminate attacks, with little concern for minimising civilian risk.

Thomas Hammarberg reported that 133 confirmed deaths was received by the commissioner from Russian authorities. Russian officials initially claimed that up to 2,000 Ossetian civilians were killed by Georgian forces; these high casualty figures were, according to Russia, the reason for the military intervention in Georgia. Claims of high casualties influenced public opinion among Ossetians; according to Human Rights Watch, some Ossetian residents they interviewed justified torching and looting Georgian villages by referring to "thousands of civilian casualties in South Ossetia" reported by Russian television. Nearly one year after the conflict, Georgia reported more than 400 deaths in the war.

In 2009, Open Society Georgia Foundation published the report on atrocities committed during August–September 2008, where the Georgian witnesses' accounts were included.

In April 2010, Georgia filed a claim to the European Court of Human Rights on behalf of the family of Giorgi Antsukhelidze, a Georgian soldier who died in captivity and an alleged subject of internet videos showing his torture at the hand of South Ossetian militias.

International Criminal Court investigation 

The International Criminal Court concluded its investigation in the Situation in Georgia in December 2022, delivering arrest warrants for three de facto South Ossetian officials believed to bear responsibility for war crimes committed during the 2008 war — Mikhail Mindzaev, Gamlet Guchmazov and David Sanakoev, respectively, holding the positions of Minister of Internal Affairs, head of a detention centre in Tskhinvali, and Presidential Representative for Human Rights of South Ossetia, at the relevant time. The fourth suspect, Russian general Vyacheslav Borisov, was not indicted as he had died in 2021.

References

External links 
Total Destruction of Georgian Village of Tamarasheni in South Ossetia
Russian troops goes through Tamarasheni village burned out by Ossetians
Грузинские села Южной Осетии (Ноябрь 2011)
Уроки русского - Russian Lessons

Russo-Georgian War